Central High School is a public secondary school for grades 9-12 located in Grand Junction, Colorado. Its enrollment is 1,598, and it is operated by Mesa County Valley School District No. 51.

History
Central High School graduated its first class of seniors in 1948. The school was first established and located in an old adobe building at 29 Road and North Avenue, a site formerly occupied by Fruitvale Elementary School and Fruitvale High School. The current CHS building near E Road was first occupied in 1959. 

In August 2009, U.S. President Barack Obama led a televised town hall meeting on healthcare reform at Central High School.

Extracurriculars
Central High offers football, baseball, tennis, soccer, and wrestling.

Central publishes a school newspaper titled The Warrior, which highlights school issues, as well as a yearbook.

Notable alumni

 Ben Garland - Professional American football player for the Denver Broncos, Atlanta Falcons, and San Francisco 49ers
 Chuck Hull - Engineer and inventor; member of the National Inventors Hall of Fame
 Amy Kame - American professional basketball player for the Townsville Fire in the WNBL

See also
List of high schools in Colorado
List of high schools in Mesa County, Colorado

References

External links

Mesa County Valley School District official website

Public high schools in Colorado
Grand Junction, Colorado
Schools in Mesa County, Colorado